Goofing off is an American slang term for engaging in recreation or an idle pastime while obligations of work or society are neglected.  Common obligations neglected in the course of goofing off include schoolwork, paid employment, social courtesies and the expectations of relations. Goofing off at school is considered to be a regular behaviour in the Western world, which is engaged in by all students at one time or another. 

When goofing off occurs within the classroom, teachers can resolve the matter quickly by direct confrontation.  Employers may use wage premiums to discourage goofing off by their employees, although it is suggested that the effects of such incentives causes aging to have a negative effect upon earnings sooner than would be otherwise expected. Goofing off has been shown to improve work or study in the right environments, and can relieve stress. It may be a form of creativity and experimentation, providing useful learning experiences and discoveries.

Some research has indicated that women tend to feel more guilt than men about taking time for themselves and so use breaks to become more organized. James C. Scott considers shirking work (goofing off) to be a frequent form of unnoticed resistance by subordinate groups.

Perhaps the most famous example of goofing off is the tale reported by Suetonius of Nero fiddling while Rome burned.

See also
 Procrastination
 Slacker
 Sloth
 Truancy

References

External links
Goofing Off; by Paul Roberts; Psychology Today; Jul/Aug 1995.
GPS Devices Catch Workers Goofing Off; NPR; 16 Nov 2007.
Goofing Off In The Computer Age:  Some Employers Crack Down On Use Of Company Computers; by Patrik Jonsson; CBS News; 18 Mar 2005.
More Time on Task, Less Goofing Off; by Fred Jones, Ph.D; Education World; 18 Aug 2003.
Home Office: Need Help Goofing Off? Dopey videos, weird pictures, and giant bugs. By Steve Bass; PC World; 29 Dec 2004.

Leisure activities